is a passenger railway station in located in the city of Yao,  Osaka Prefecture, Japan, operated by the private railway operator Kintetsu Railway.

Lines
Takayasu Station is served by the Osaka Line, and is located 12.2 rail kilometers from the starting point of the line at Ōsaka Uehommachi Station. The ticket gate is only one place. The length of the platform is 10 cars ( about 200 meter)

Station layout
The station consists of two elevated island platforms with the station building underneath.

Platforms

Adjacent stations

History
Takayasu Station opened on September 30, 1925.

Passenger statistics
In fiscal 2018, the station was used by an average of 11,202 passengers daily.

Surrounding area
Osaka Prefectural Route 181
West side
Takayasu Depot, Takayasu Workshop
Tamakushi River
Yao Yamamoto Baseball Stadium
Yao Takayasu Post Office
Konko Yao Junior and Senior High School
East side
Takayasu-ekimae-dori Shotengai
Onji River

See also
List of railway stations in Japan

References

External links

 Takayasu Station 

Railway stations in Japan opened in 1925
Railway stations in Osaka Prefecture
Yao, Osaka